Marvin Graves (born February 7, 1971) is a former quarterback in the Canadian Football League as well as one of the top signal-callers in the history of Syracuse University.

High school
Graves was a standout quarterback at Archbishop Carroll High School (Washington, D.C.), and also excelled at basketball and baseball for the Washington, D.C. high school.

College
Graves finished his career as the all-time passing yardage leader at Syracuse (8,466), leading the Orange in the category each of his four campaigns. His 48 touchdown tosses rank second in program history. Graves quarterbacked SU to victories in the 1990 Aloha bowl, the 1992 Hall of Fame bowl, where he was named MVP, and the 1993 Fiesta bowl, where he was named co-MVP with Kevin Mitchell. In a 1992 game vs. Rutgers, he gained 476 yards.

Graves was named to Syracuse University's All-Century team in November, 1999.

Professional career
Graves was a quarterback for the Toronto Argonauts (1994–1995), the Saskatchewan Roughriders (1996, 2000–2001), and the Montreal Alouettes (1997).

Coaching career
After his CFL career, Graves went on to coach for Washington, D.C. high schools as well as several quarterback camps. He coached quarterbacks for the Division III Catholic University of America.

Ultimate Frisbee ownership
In 2013, Graves was the co-owner of the Washington, D.C. professional Ultimate team, the DC Breeze.

References

External links
Marvin Graves website

1971 births
Living people
American football quarterbacks
Syracuse Orange football players
Catholic University Cardinals football coaches
Canadian football quarterbacks
Toronto Argonauts players
Saskatchewan Roughriders players
Montreal Alouettes players
Hamilton Tiger-Cats players
Players of American football from Washington, D.C.
Archbishop Carroll High School (Washington, D.C.) alumni